The 54th edition of the annual Four Hills Tournament was held in the traditional venues: Oberstorf and Garmisch-Partenkirchen in Germany, and Innsbruck and Bischofshofen in Austria. For the first and only time, the two ski jumpers at the top of the table shared exactly the same number of points after all four events. The competitors in question, Janne Ahonen and Jakub Janda, were both declared tournament winners. For Ahonen, it was the fourth tournament victory, equalizing the record of Jens Weißflog. He would surpass Weißflog and become the lone record holder two years later.

Format

At each of the four events, a qualification round would be held. The 50 best jumpers would qualify for the competition. The fifteen athletes leading the World Cup at the time would qualify automatically. In case of an omitted qualification or a result that would normally result in elimination, they would instead qualify as 50th.

Unlike the procedure at normal World Cup events, the 50 qualified athletes would be paired up for the first round of the final event, with the winner qualifying for the second round. The rounds start with the duel between #26 and #25 from the qualification round, followed by #27 vs #24, up to #50 vs #1. The five best duel losers, so-called 'Lucky Losers' also qualify for the second round.

For the tournament ranking, the total points earned from each jump are added together. The World Cup points collected during the four events are disregarded in this ranking.

World Cup Standings

The events during the Four Hills tournament count as part of the World Cup season. The standings at the time of the tournament, after seven out of twenty-two events, were as follows:

Participating nations and athletes

The number of athletes a nation was allowed to nominate was dependent on previous results. In addition, a "national group" from the host nation is added to each event.

The defending champion was Janne Ahonen. Four other competitors had also previously won the Four Hills tournament: Primož Peterka in 1996-97, Andreas Widhölzl in 1999-00, Adam Małysz in 2000-01 and Sigurd Pettersen in 2003-04.

The following athletes were nominated:

Results

Oberstorf
 Schattenbergschanze, Oberstorf
28-29 December 2005

Qualification winner:  Andreas Widhölzl

Garmisch-Partenkirchen
 Große Olympiaschanze, Garmisch-Partenkirchen
31 December 2005 - 1 January 2006

Qualification winner:  Noriaki Kasai

Innsbruck
 Bergiselschanze, Innsbruck
03-4 January 2006

Qualification winner:  Janne Ahonen

Bischofshofen
 Paul-Ausserleitner-Schanze, Bischofshofen
05-6 January 2006

Qualification winner:  Janne Ahonen

After three out of four events, World Cup leader Jakub Janda was two points ahead of defending champion Janne Ahonen. With Janda skipping the qualification tournament, and Ahonen winning it, there was a direct duel between the two jumpers at the first round of the final tournament. Janda jumped first, and reached 141.0m, surpassing the leading Ljøkelsøy by four meters. Ahonen then reached the same distance, but lost the duel due to worse Judges Marks by one point. As the best duel loser, he still qualified for the second and final round in second place.

Ahonen reached 141.5 meters in his second attempt, earning 146.7 points. With Janda then reaching 'only' 139.0 meters in the tournament's final jump (still the second-furthest jump of the second round), earning 143.7 points, Ahonen surpassed him in the Bischofshofen ranking and equalized in the tournament ranking - both having scored exactly 1081.5 points over the four events.

Final ranking

Lars Bystøl, who won the Innsbruck event, placed only 20th or above in the other three competitions and placed 16th in the final ranking.

References

External links
 FIS website
 Four Hills Tournament web site

 
Fis Ski Jumping World Cup, 2005-06
Fis Ski Jumping World Cup, 2005-06